Cát Linh Station is a metro station in Hanoi, located in Đống Đa, Hanoi. It is an interchange station of the Cát Linh Line and the Văn Miếu Line.

Station layout

Line 2A

References

External links
Cát Linh Station

Hanoi Metro stations
Railway stations in Vietnam opened in 2021